Alphonso Correia Long (1927 – 2005) was a Guyanese weightlifter. He competed in the men's featherweight event at the 1948 Summer Olympics.

References

1927 births
2005 deaths
Guyanese male weightlifters
Olympic weightlifters of British Guiana
Weightlifters at the 1948 Summer Olympics
Place of birth missing